In geography and urban planning, elbow roomers are people who leave a city for the countryside to seek more land and greater freedom from governmental and neighborhood interference.

Some are carrying out activities such as large-scale gardening, the raising of horses or other animals, or farming, or otherwise have a genuine need for the space.  Others wish to pursue a rural lifestyle for reasons unrelated to space itself.

Elbow roomers are often said to contribute to urban sprawl, though some authorities claim they are a part of the natural evolution of the edges of urban areas.

See also
 Treechange

External links

Urban studies and planning terminology